Sbtrkt (stylised as SBTRKT) is the debut studio album by English musician Sbtrkt. Pitchfork placed the album at number 42 on its list of the "Top 50 albums of 2011".

Reception

At Metacritic, Sbtrkt holds an average score of 76 out of 100, based on 21 reviews, which indicates "generally favorable reviews." It won DJ Magazine album of the year and came #49 in the NME albums of 2011.

Singles
 "Living Like I Do" ft. Sampha was the first single which was released on 11 April 2011 on vinyl and as a download. The B-side being a Machinedrum remix of "Look at Stars".
The instrumental version was released previously, entitled 'Colonise' from the Step In Shadows - EP.
 "Wildfire" ft. Little Dragon was the second single which was released on 23 May 2011. The remix of Wildfire featuring Drake was released for this single's B-side.
 "Pharaohs" ft. Roses Gabor was the third single which was released on 5 September 2011. The official video was released on 7 September 2011.
 "Hold On" ft. Sampha was the fourth single which was released on 19 March 2012. The official video was released on 21 March 2012. Hold On includes "Ride to Freedom" as a B-side.

Track listing

Charts

Certifications

References

2011 debut albums
SBTRKT albums
Young Turks (record label) albums